United Nations Security Council Resolution 1971, adopted unanimously on March 3, 2011, after recalling previous resolutions on the situation in Liberia and Sierra Leone, including Resolution 1626 (2005), the Council requested the United Nations Mission in Liberia (UNMIL) to withdraw its military personnel providing security for the Special Court for Sierra Leone, and placed the responsibility for security with the Sierra Leone Police.

Resolution

Observations
Resolution 1626 had authorised an UNMIL contingent to protect the Special Court. The Security Council praised the role of UNMIL, particularly the Mongolian contingent of the mission. It noted that the Registrar of the Special Court had stated that there would be no need for a military guard after February 2011, while the Sierra Leone government had requested that a withdrawal be postponed until late February or early March 2011.

Acts
Acting under Chapter VII of the United Nations Charter, the Council ended the authorisation given to 150 UNMIL personnel to protect the Special Court and asked it to withdraw by 7 March 2011.  UNMIL could also no longer evacuate officials of the Special Court in the event of an emergency. The Council awaited security to be provided by local security, while the United Nations Integrated Peacebuilding Office in Sierra Leone (UNIPSIL) was instructed to include officials of the Special Court within its evacuation procedures.

See also 
 List of United Nations Security Council Resolutions 1901 to 2000 (2009–2011)
 Second Liberian Civil War
 Sierra Leone Civil War

References

External links
 
Text of the Resolution at undocs.org

 1971
 1971
 1971
2011 in Liberia
2011 in Sierra Leone
March 2011 events